Muayad Khalid  (born 3 September 1987) is an Iraqi former professional footballer who played as a right-back.

Career
Born in Baghdad in September 1985, Khalid was spotted by an Al Talaba scout and began playing for the local giants as a teenager. He later moved on to Al Quwa Al Jawiya in 2005, where he has played a key role in defence. He then moved back to Al Talaba and then to Al Zawraa. In September 2011, he signed a contract with his current club Al Zawraa.

In 2016, he was playing football in Vienna.

Having excelled as a right-back for major Iraqi clubs such as Al Talaba and Al Quwa Al Jawiya, Moaayed Khlalid earned a call-up from Iraq's former interim coach Radhi Shenaishil in 2009. 

The previous highlight for Khlalid at international level had been featuring in Iraq's silver-winning campaign in the 2006 Asian Games at Doha. In 2009 Moaayed was called up for the Iraqi national team squad by Bora Milutinović to compete in the confederations cup. He played well against world champion Spain in a match that Iraq lost 1–0.

Honours 
Al-Talaba
 Iraq FA Cup: 2001–02, 2002–03
 Iraqi Elite League: 2001–02
 Iraqi Perseverance Cup: 2002

Al-Zawraa
 Iraqi Elite League: 2010–11

Iraq
 2006 Asian Games Silver medalist

Iraq Police
 Arab Police Championship: 2002

References

External links
 
 Profile on Goalzz

Living people
1985 births
Sportspeople from Baghdad
Iraqi footballers
Association football defenders
Iraq international footballers
Al-Talaba SC players
2009 FIFA Confederations Cup players
Al-Quwa Al-Jawiya players
Asian Games medalists in football
Footballers at the 2006 Asian Games
Al-Shorta SC players
Asian Games silver medalists for Iraq
Medalists at the 2006 Asian Games
Iraqi expatriate footballers
Iraqi expatriate sportspeople in Austria
Expatriate footballers in Austria
Iraqi expatriate sportspeople in Bangladesh
Expatriate footballers in Bangladesh